St Leonard's Hospital may refer to:

 St Leonard's Hospital, Ferndown, a community hospital in Dorset
 St Leonard's Hospital, Hackney, a former hospital in London, built in 1913
 St Leonard's Hospital, Tickhill, a former monastic building in South Yorkshire, built in 1470
 St Leonard's Hospital, York, ruined building in North Yorkshire